Dawsonia campanulata is an organic-walled Palaeozoic organism of unknown affinity. It resembles a shell or purse.

References

Incertae sedis